Nicolas Dumont (born 15 June 1973) is a French road cyclist.

Major results

1996
 1st Stage 4 Tour de l'Ain
 1st Stage 2b Ronde de l'Isard
1998
 3rd Tour du Finistère
2000
 4th Tour du Doubs
 5th GP de Villers-Cotterêts
2002
 1st  Overall Circuit des Ardennes
 1st Grand Prix des Marbriers
 2nd Overall Ruban Granitier Breton
2003
 2nd Tour du Jura
 3rd Overall Circuit des Ardennes
2004
 3rd Overall Tour de Guadeloupe
1st Stage 5
2007
 1st Stage 2 Vuelta a la Independencia Nacional
 2nd Overall Tour de la Guadeloupe
2009
 1st  Overall Tour de Guadeloupe
1st Stages 2b (TTT) & 8b
2012
 9th Overall Tour de Guadeloupe

References

External links 

French male cyclists
Tour de Guadeloupe winners
Tour de Guadeloupe stage winners
1973 births
Living people